Lecithocera flavipalpis is a moth in the family Lecithoceridae. It was described by Walsingham in 1891. It is found in Mozambique, South Africa and Zimbabwe.

The wingspan is about 18 mm. The forewings are deep bronze-colour, without markings. The hindwings are paler than the forewings, bronzy fuscous.

References

Moths described in 1891
flavipalpis